Bath ḳōl is a divine voice in Judaism.

Bat Kol may also refer to:

 Bat Kol (organization), an Israeli organization for lesbians who are Orthodox Jews
 Bat Kol Institute, a Christian-Jewish studies organization; see